A benefit concert or charity concert is a type of musical benefit performance (e.g., concert, show, or gala) featuring musicians, comedians, or other performers that is held for a charitable purpose, often directed at a specific and immediate humanitarian crisis.

Benefit concerts can have both subjective and concrete objectives. Subjective objectives include raising awareness about an issue such as misery in Africa (such as Live 8) and uplifting a nation after a disaster (such as America: A Tribute to Heroes). Concrete objectives include raising funds (such as Live Aid) and influencing legislation (such as Live 8 or Farm Aid). The two largest benefit concerts of all time, in size, were the Live 8 and the Live Earth events, which both attracted billions of spectators. Scholars theorize that the observed increase on concert size since the Live Aid is happening because organizers strive to make their events as big as the tragedy at hand, thus hoping to gain legitimization that way.

History

Examples exist in musical history of concerts being staged for philanthropic purposes. In 1749, the composer George Frideric Handel wrote his Foundling Hospital Anthem, and put on annual performances of Messiah, to support an orphans' charity in London. While many composers and performers took part in concerts to raise donations for charitable causes, it was also not unusual in the 18th and 19th centuries for musicians to stage performances to raise funds for their own professional work, such as Ludwig van Beethoven's 1808 Akademie concert.

The modern understanding of a benefit concert is of a large-scale, popular event put on to support a charitable or political cause. In the modern era, the first benefit concert is generally seen as the 1971 Concert For Bangladesh. Comprising two shows on the same day at Madison Square Garden, it was organized by and starred George Harrison and Ravi Shankar. The format of most modern benefit concerts, involving many acts, was pioneered in 1985 with Bob Geldof's Live Aid.

Celebrity charity

Benefit concerts are a major example of celebrity charity for they involve popular musicians; actors and actresses; and other kinds of entertainment figures volunteering to a greater cause. The efficiency of celebrity charity is explained by the theory of Catalytic Philanthropy designed by Paul Schervish. His thesis explains that it is more beneficial to a cause that celebrities do not contribute by only donating their money, but by participating in event like benefit concerts. That way stars can inspire hundreds of thousands of others to give.
	
The presence of celebrities can draw criticism, but that is outweighed by the benefits. Some argue that pop stars only take part in charity to improve their public image. That, arguably, may be a motivation, but their participation can be essential to the event's success. Celebrities not only promote catalytic philanthropy, they can produce an effect some call Geldofism: "The mobilization of pop stars and their fans behind a cause." Therefore, because of their visibility, celebrities are used by organizers as a mean to gain support to the cause in hand.
	
Furthermore, the success of benefit concerts is tightly related to the quality of entertainment offered by them. To gain space and legitimization in the media, benefit concerts must have a large audience, the kind of large crowd attracted by famous music stars. Bob Geldof himself responded to criticisms about the lack of African artists on the Live 8 by stating that, although those musicians produce great works, they do not sell many albums—and, for the sake of reaching as many people as possible, his concert had to include only popular artists.

Finally, the quality of entertainment is key to the creation of a public sphere where discussions about the concert's cause can occur. The better the entertainment, the more people watch the concert, and thus the more people become aware of the cause. Furthermore, the music played in the concerts can lead spectators to interconnect and become more likely to act towards the cause. According to a theory, by Jane Bennett, when people sing in the presence of other people, and that happens in benefit concerts, they become connected to each other and are more likely to work together towards a goal.

Critics also say that benefit concerts are just a way for the rich West to forgive itself by helping the poor and distressed. These critiques argue that concerts like the Live Aid "rob Africans of agency, reinforces Western ethnocentrism and racisms and see famine as a natural disaster rather than as a political issue".

Effectiveness 
Benefit concerts are an effective form of gaining support and raising funds for a cause because of the large media coverage that they usually receive. In addition to the results they generate themselves, benefit concerts also generate a kind of cascading effect. That is, larger benefit concert motivate smaller concerts and other kinds of charity initiatives.

As media events 
Large-scale benefit concerts attract millions of viewers and are usually broadcast internationally. As powerful means of mass communication, they can be highly effective at raising funds and awareness for humanitarian causes. Media scholars Dayan and Katz classify benefit concerts as "media events":  shared experiences that unite viewers with one another and their societies. In fact, in their book Media Events: The Live Broadcasting of History, the authors suggest that the song synonymous with the Live Aid benefit concert, "We Are the World," might as well be the theme song for media events, as it nicely encompasses the tone of such occasions: "these ceremonies (media events) are so all-encompassing that there is nobody left to serve-as out-group".  
	
Dayan and Katz define media events as shared experiences that unite viewers and call their attention to a particular cause or occasion. They argue that media events interrupt the flow people's daily lives, and that such events create a rise of interpersonal communication or "fellow feeling". Furthermore, they propose that media events transform the ordinary role of the viewer into something more interactive where they adhere to the script of the event. All these principles of media events are true of benefit concerts. Benefit concerts interrupt the routine of people's lives because they occur (in most cases) for only for one night or for one week-end. Furthermore, they are broadcast as television spectacles that interrupt the regular scheduled programming on a given television network. Often, this kind of announced interruption has television viewers discussing the event with others beforehand, generating excitement around the event. Moreover, benefit concerts encourage audiences to adhere to their script, such as by phoning in donations or signing an online pledge.

Benefit concerts and para-social interaction 

As media events, benefit concerts are widely broadcast and seen by millions of people. (The Live Aid charity concert in 1985, for example, was seen by an estimated 1.5 billion viewers worldwide.) However, this mass dissemination is only one of the factors that contribute to the success of benefit concerts. The people who send the message for collective action are essential to a benefit concert's effectiveness.

Dayan and Katz suggest that media events are an expression of a "neo-romantic desire for heroic action", meaning that media events produce leaders who inspire collective action with belief in the "power of the people" to change the world. Benefit concerts, therefore, have the potential to raise enormous sums of money for a cause because of the para-social interaction that occurs between the performing celebrities (the leaders) and the spectating fans (the people).

Dan Laughey describes para-social interaction as "the apparent familiarity between media personalities and audiences". Seeing a favourite celebrity support a cause can influence fans to support the same cause—not because the cause is significant to the fans, but because it seems significant to the artist. To feel connected to a celebrity, fans are likely to participate in activities the celebrity considers important. For example, if a benefit concert starred unknown musicians performing songs for unknown people in Africa, the incentive for viewers to donate would be minimal. Bob Geldof, the founder of Live Aid, is aware of the need of familiarity and para-social interaction on behalf of the viewer. When criticised for not inviting enough African performers to play at Live Aid (of which the main purpose was famine relief for Africa), Geldof commented that only popular musicians were invited to play at the show because unfamiliar artists would cause viewers to lose interest and "switch off". In seeing the familiar face of their beloved artist on stage endorsing a cause, fans feel more compelled to support the cause.

Criticisms
Criticisms against benefit concerts go further than just criticizing the intentions of the celebrities involved. Some argue that benefit concerts are a wrong response for tragedies because the atmosphere involved on them is hardly one of mourning. Further criticism comes from those who argue that Geldofism turns celebrities into the only legitimate spokespeople for a cause, robbing the NGOs of the possibilities to speak up for a cause.

Notable examples

In chronological order, beginning with the earliest date:

The Foundling Hospital Anthem (1749) and annual performances of Messiah (1749–59)
Staged by the composer George Frideric Handel in support of the Foundling Hospital, a children's charity in London.

 Historic Concert for the Benefit of Widows and Orphans of Austrian and Hungarian Soldiers (1918)
January 12, 1918 – The Historic Concert for the Benefit of Widows and Orphans of Austrian and Hungarian Soldiers was held at the Konzerthaus, Vienna. Its patrons were Kaiser Charles I of Austria and Empress Zita of Bourbon-Parma, with posters designed by Josef Divéky. An estimated 1,100,000 Austro-Hungarian men, mostly unmarried, were killed in the war.

 The Concert for Bangladesh (1971)
August 1, 1971 – The Concert for Bangladesh took place at Madison Square Garden, New York City. Conceived and produced by George Harrison, performers included Harrison, Ravi Shankar, Bob Dylan, Eric Clapton, Ringo Starr, Billy Preston, Leon Russell.

Festival of Hope Rockfest (1972)
August 12–13, 1972 – The Festival of Hope Rockfest took place at Roosevelt Raceway in Westbury, New York. It was sponsored by the Nassau Easter Seals Society to benefit crippled children. The performers were: Ike & Tina Turner, Sly & The Family Stone, Jefferson Airplane, Chuck Berry, James Brown, The Shirelles, Sha-na-na, Billy Preston, Dr. Hook, Looking Glass, Bo Diddly, Stephen Still, McKendree Spring, Elephant's Memory, The James Gang, and Commander Cody.

 A Poke in the Eye (With A Sharp Stick) (1976)
April 1–3, 1976 – Amnesty International staged the first in what became its long-running Secret Policeman's Ball series of events raising funds for – and awareness of – human rights issues.  The show titled A Poke in the Eye was staged at Her Majesty's Theatre in London over three consecutive nights. It was primarily a comedy gala starring Monty Python, Peter Cook, Beyond The Fringe and others. Produced by John Cleese and Martin Lewis.

 A Gift of Song: The Music for UNICEF Concert (1979)
January 9, 1979 – The A Gift of Song: The Music for UNICEF Concert was held at the United Nations General Assembly and broadcast worldwide to raise money for UNICEF and mark the International Year of the Child.  Performers included ABBA, Bee Gees, Andy Gibb, Olivia Newton-John, John Denver, Earth, Wind & Fire, Rita Coolidge, Kris Kristofferson, Rod Stewart, Donna Summer. The concert was the idea of impresario Robert Stigwood, the Bee Gees, and David Frost.

 The Secret Policeman's Ball (1979)
June 27–30, 1979 – Amnesty International staged the third of its Secret Policeman's Ball benefits.  The show titled The Secret Policeman's Ball was staged in London over four consecutive nights. In addition to the usual comedic performers from Monty Python, producer Martin Lewis secured musical performances from Pete Townshend and Tom Robinson.

 The No Nukes concerts (1979)
September 1979 – The No Nukes concerts in New York

 The Concerts for Kampuchea (1979)
December 26–29, 1979 – The Concerts for Kampuchea were held at the Hammersmith Odeon, benefiting the citizens of Cambodia who were victims of the tyrannical reign of dictator Pol Pot.

 The Secret Policeman's Other Ball (1981)
September 9–12, 1981 – Amnesty International staged the fourth of its Secret Policeman's Ball benefits.  The show titled The Secret Policeman's Other Ball was staged in London over four consecutive nights. This show expanded on its 1979 predecessor with appearances by multiple rock musicians including Sting, Eric Clapton, Jeff Beck, Phil Collins, Donovan and Bob Geldof.

Nuclear Disarmament Rally (1982)
June 12, 1982 – In New York City, 750,000 people marched from the UN to Central Park to protest nuclear weapons – in what was probably the largest single protest in U.S. history. NYC was shut down for the day. The concert featured artists including Jackson Browne, Linda Ronstadt, and Bruce Springsteen. Keith Haring created a poster for the event, which was handed out free to the audience.

 Live Aid (1985)
July 13, 1985 – The Live Aid benefit concerts – conceived and organised by Bob Geldof and Midge Ure – took place in London and Philadelphia.  Similar concerts were held in Sydney and Moscow.

 Farm Aid (1985)
September 22, 1985 – The first Farm Aid concert, organised by Willie Nelson and John Mellencamp to raise money for family farmers in the United States, was held in Champaign, Illinois. There have been 19 Farm Aid concerts as of 2007.

 Self Aid (1986)
May 17, 1986 – The Self Aid concert held in Dublin, Ireland, aimed to highlight the chronic unemployment problem in Ireland at the time. Performers at the event included U2, Van Morrison and The Pogues.

 Conspiracy of Hope US Tour (1986)
June 4–15, 1986 – The Conspiracy of Hope US tour of six rock concerts for Amnesty International.  Performers included U2, Sting, Joan Baez, Lou Reed, Jackson Browne, The Neville Brothers and, at the final three concerts, a reunion of The Police.

Heart Beat 86 (1986)
March 15, 1986 – The Heart Beat 86 concert was held near Birmingham England to raise money for the Birmingham Children's Hospital.

 Human Rights Now! World Tour (1988)
September 2 – October 15, 1988 The Human Rights Now! World tour of rock concerts for Amnesty International

 The Wall – Live in Berlin (1990 July 21) Roger Waters (Memorial Fund for Disaster Relief)

A live concert performance by Roger Waters and numerous guest artists, of the Pink Floyd studio album The Wall, itself largely written by Waters during his time with the band. The show was held in Berlin on 21 July 1990, to commemorate the fall of the Berlin Wall eight months earlier. The event was produced and cast by British impresario and producer Tony Hollingsworth. It was staged partly at Waters' expense. While he subsequently earned the money back from the sale of the CD and video releases of the album, the original plan was to donate all profits past his initial investment to the Memorial Fund for Disaster Relief, a UK charity founded by Leonard Cheshire. However, audio and video sales came in significantly under projections, and the trading arm of the charity (Operation Dinghy) incurred heavy losses. A few years later, the charity was wound up, and the audio and video sales rights from the concert performance returned to Waters. The show had a sell-out crowd of over 350,000 people, and before the performance started, the gates were opened, which let at least another 100,000 people watch. Guest artists Rick Danko, Levon Helm and Garth Hudson of The Band, The Hooters, Van Morrison, Sinéad O'Connor, Cyndi Lauper, Marianne Faithfull, Scorpions, Joni Mitchell, Paul Carrack, Thomas Dolby and Bryan Adams, along with actors Albert Finney, Jerry Hall, Tim Curry and Ute Lemper. Cheshire opened the concert by blowing a World War II whistle.

 The Freddie Mercury Tribute Concert (1992)
April 20, 1992 – The Freddie Mercury Tribute Concert was organised by the surviving members of Queen (John Deacon, Brian May and Roger Taylor)  which took place at Wembley Stadium, London, to pay homage to their deceased lead singer Freddie Mercury and to raise money for the Mercury Phoenix Trust, a fund for victims of AIDS. Among the performers: David Bowie, Elton John, Metallica, Guns N' Roses, Def Leppard, Extreme, Robert Plant, Liza Minnelli, Roger Daltrey and George Michael.

 America: A Tribute to Heroes (2001)
September 21, 2001 – America: A Tribute to Heroes was a telethon in the style of a benefit concert organised in the aftermath of the September 11, 2001 attacks on the World Trade Center and The Pentagon by the four major United States television networks.

 The Concert for New York City (2001)
October 20, 2001 – The Concert for New York City was a benefit concert organised as a tribute to the heroes and survivors of the September 11, 2001 attacks on New York.  It was initiated by Paul McCartney and produced by a team including Harvey Weinstein and Jann Wenner.

The SARS Benefit Concert (2003)
July 30, 2003 – 450,000 spectators saw The Rolling Stones, AC/DC, Rush, The Guess Who, and others at the largest concert in Canadian history, the SARS Benefit Concert in Toronto, Ontario, Canada, held to prove that the city was safe from SARS.

 Live 8 (2005)
July 2, 2005 – Bob Geldof and Midge Ure organised Live 8, a set of 8 concerts held in 8 cities around the world on the same day – as part of a campaign to persuade the G8 member governments to increase their fight to eradicate poverty in third-world countries.

 Live Earth (2007)
July 7, 2007 – Al Gore inspired and helped organise Live Earth. During its first year, it consisted of a series of concerts held on all seven continents of the planet on the same day.

A Billion Hands Concert (2008)
December 5, 2008 – Anoushka Shankar and Jethro Tull held A Billion Hands Concert in Mumbai, India. All proceeds from the concert went to victims of the November 2008 Mumbai attacks.

Rockdrive (ongoing)
December 11, 2010 – Max Lugavere held Rockdrive for its third year in Los Angeles, California at the Troubadour. Proceeds from the concert went to charities supporting public education, generally the Los Angeles Unified School District. In 2011, the Rockdrive movement was initiated in Nashville and Miami.

12-12-12: The Concert for Sandy Relief (2012)
December 12, 2012 – 12-12-12: The Concert for Sandy Relief was held at Madison Square Garden in New York City. Proceeds went to the Robin Hood Relief Fund to benefit the victims of Hurricane Sandy.

MDA Show of Strength (2012–2014)
The former Jerry Lewis MDA Telethon, which aired each year every Labor Day weekend, was dramatically reformatted over the course of 2011 and 2012; from the program's founding in 1966 until 2010, the program aired as a traditional long-form telethon over the course of 21 hours. By the time of the 2012 edition, its name was changed to the current moniker, its longtime host was ousted, and its format was reduced to a three-hour benefit concert for the Muscular Dystrophy Association. The MDA announced the event's discontinuation in May 2015 in order to focus on other ways to raise support for the organization via mobile and digital media.

One Love Manchester (2017)
June 4, 2017 – Ariana Grande organised a concert in dedication to the 22 victims killed at her concert that was held on 22 May 2017 at the Manchester Arena.

Hand in Hand: A Benefit for Hurricane Relief (2017)
September 12, 2017 – A one-hour, commercial-free benefit concert television special for the relief efforts from the aftermath of Hurricane Harvey and Hurricane Irma (with later benefits also going to victims of Hurricane Maria the following week).

List of benefit concerts

The following is an incomplete list of benefit concerts with their own Wikipedia page. For a more descriptive and inclusive list focusing on historically notable events, see the list above. Note that while some of the listed concerts feature only one headliner and several supporting acts, other benefit concerts feature diverse lineups and are also considered music festivals. This list may have some overlap with list of free festivals, which are rock festivals that often have a social agenda or fund-raising focus.

Rock and pop concerts

Bibliography